Ecobank Nigeria Limited, commonly referred to as Ecobank Nigeria, is a commercial bank in Nigeria. It is one of the commercial banks licensed by the Central Bank of Nigeria, the national banking regulator.

Overview
The bank began operations in 1989. It operates as a universal bank, providing wholesale, retail, corporate, investment and transaction banking services to its customers in the Nigerian market. The bank divides its operations into three major divisions: (a) Retail Banking, (b) Wholesale Banking and (c) Treasury & Financial Institutions. The bank also offers capital markets and investment banking services. During the fourth quarter of 2011, Ecobank Nigeria through its parent company Ecobank Transnational Inc. (ETI) acquired 100% of the shareholding in Oceanic Bank, creating the expanded Ecobank Nigeria Limited. , the expanded Ecobank Nigeria controlled total assets valued at approximately US$8.1 billion (NGN:1.32 trillion), making it one of the five largest banks in Nigeria at the time. At that time the bank had 610 freestanding branches, making it the second-largest bank in the country by branch network.

Ecobank network
Ecobank Nigeria is a member of Ecobank, the leading independent pan-African bank, headquartered in Lomé, Togo, with affiliates in West, Central and East Africa. Ecobank, which was established in 1985, has grown to a network of over 1,000 branches, employing over 10,000 people, with offices in 32 countries including Benin, Burkina Faso, Burundi, Cameroon, Cape Verde, the Central African Republic, Chad, the Republic of Congo, the Democratic Republic of Congo, Côte d'Ivoire, Gambia, Ghana, Guinea, Guinea Bissau, Kenya, Liberia, Mali, Malawi, Niger, Nigeria, Rwanda, Sao Tome, Senegal, Sierra Leone, Togo, Uganda, Zambia and Zimbabwe. Ecobank also maintains a banking subsidiary in Paris and representative offices in Johannesburg, Dubai and London.

Parent company
Ecobank Transnational Inc. (ETI) is the parent company of the Ecobank Group, which includes the following specialized subsidiaries:

 Ecobank Development Corporation (EDC) – Lomé, Togo
 EDC Investment Corporation – Abidjan, Ivory Coast
 EDC Investment Corporation – Douala, Cameroon
 EDC Securities Limited – Lagos, Nigeria
 EDC Stockbrokers Limited – Accra, Ghana
 Ecobank Asset Management – Abidjan, Ivory Coast
 e-Process International SA – Lomé, Togo
 ECV Servicios – Praia, Cape Verde

The stock of ETI is traded on three African stock exchanges: the Ghana Stock Exchange (GSE), the Nigerian Stock Exchange (NSE) and the BRVM stock exchange in Abidjan, Ivory Coast.

Branch network
As of December 2011, the expanded Ecobank Nigeria Limited. is projected to have in excess of 600 branches, in all parts of the Federal Republic of Nigeria, following the merger of Oceanic Bank.

See also

 Ecobank Transnational
 List of banks in Nigeria
 Economy of Nigeria
 Ecobank Ghana
 Ecobank Uganda
 Ecobank Zimbabwe
 List of banks in Africa.

References

External links
 

Banks of Nigeria
Banks established in 1989
Companies based in Lagos
Nigerian companies established in 1989